is a detective Japanese television drama, part of the Spring 2010 season of the Japanese TBS Network. It is based on the same-name novel in the "Kyōichirō Kaga" series by mystery author Keigo Higashino and is set and filmed in the Ningyo-cho area of Nihonbashi, Tokyo. This series was followed by a special "Akai Yubi" aired on January 3, 2011 and a feature film The Wings of the Kirin, released on January 28, 2012.

Synopsis
Shinzanmono is the name given to a newcomer. In this case, the newcomer is Kaga Kyōichirō (played by Hiroshi Abe) an experienced detective who is newly transferred to Nihonbashi Police Station in Tokyo. A woman has been murdered and he has been assigned to the team investigating the murder. As the story unfolds he finds out more about the woman, her family, and the last days of her life; hopefully leading up to the apprehension of the culprit. In the process, he uncovers the secrets of some of those who were somehow tied up in the murdered woman's life, who may, or may not have been suspects, but who were hiding truths that needed to be told.

Cast
Hiroshi Abe as Kyōichirō Kaga
Meisa Kuroki as Ami Aoyama
Osamu Mukai as Kōki Kiyose
Junpei Mizobata as Shūhei Matsumiya
Yuichi Kimura as Kazumichi Kojima
Takashi Sasano as Yosaku Kishida
Mieko Harada as Mineko Mitsui
Tomokazu Miura as Naohiro Kiyose

Guests
Yumi Asō (ep1)
Kanji Tsuda (ep1)
Kenji Anan (ep1)
Teruyuki Kagawa (ep1)
Anne/Anne Watanabe (ep1)
Takashi Kobayashi (ep1)
Etsuko Ichihara (ep1)
Susumu Terajima (ep2)
Yui Natsukawa (ep2)
Hideo Ishiguro (ep2)
Mao Miyaji (ep2,4,8)
Yuko Ogura (ep3)
Haru (ep4)
Taichi Saotome (ep7,10)
Mokomichi Hayami (ep9,10)
Monta Mino (ep10)

Production credits
Original writing (novel): Shinzanmono by Higashino Keigo
Screenwriter: , 
Producers: , 
Directors: , Hirano Shunichi
Music: Yugo Kanno

See also
 The Wings of the Kirin
 Nemuri no Mori
 The Crimes That Bind

References

External links
Official website

2010 in Japanese television
Japanese drama television series
2010 Japanese television series debuts
2010 Japanese television series endings
Nichiyō Gekijō
Television shows based on Japanese novels
Television shows based on works by Keigo Higashino